The 2021 Challenger de Buenos Aires was a professional tennis tournament played on clay courts. It was the tenth edition of the tournament which was part of the 2021 ATP Challenger Tour. It took place in Buenos Aires, Argentina between 18 and 24 October 2021.

Singles main-draw entrants

Seeds

 1 Rankings are as of 4 October 2021.

Other entrants
The following players received wildcards into the singles main draw:
  Román Andrés Burruchaga
  Mariano Navone
  Juan Bautista Torres

The following players received entry from the qualifying draw:
  Francisco Comesaña
  Martín Cuevas
  Carlos Gómez-Herrera
  Ignacio Monzón

Champions

Singles

  Sebastián Báez def.  Thiago Monteiro 6–4, 6–0.

Doubles

  Luciano Darderi /  Juan Bautista Torres def.  Hernán Casanova /  Santiago Rodríguez Taverna 7–6(7–5), 7–6(12–10).

References

2021 ATP Challenger Tour
2021
2021 in Argentine tennis
October 2021 sports events in Argentina